Molecular & Cellular Proteomics is a monthly peer-reviewed scientific journal established in 2002 and published by the American Society for Biochemistry and Molecular Biology. It covers research on structural and functional properties of proteins, especially with regard to development.

Scope & history
The journal also publishes other content such as "HUPO views", which are reports from the Human Proteome Organization (HUPO), proceedings from HUPO meetings, and the proceedings of the International Symposium On Mass Spectrometry In The Life Sciences.

As of January 2010, the journal is published online only and no longer available in print. The editor-in-chief is A.L. Burlingame. All articles are available free 1 year after publication. In press articles are available free on its website immediately after acceptance.

Abstracting and indexing
MCP is indexed in Medline, PubMed, Index Medicus, the Science Citation Index, Current Contents - Life Sciences, Scopus, BIOSIS Previews, Web of Knowledge and the Chemical Abstracts Service.

References

External links 
 

Proteomics journals
Delayed open access journals
Publications established in 2002
English-language journals
Monthly journals
2002 establishments in the United States